The province of Benguet has 269 barangays comprising its 13 municipalities and 1 independent city.

Barangays

References

Benguet
Populated places in Benguet